Gry Blekastad Almås (born 28 May 1970 in Oslo) is a Norwegian journalist.

Almås has worked as a news anchor on the evening news program Dagsrevyen, aired on the Norwegian Broadcasting Corporation. In 2010 she was appointed as a correspondent stationed in London, an office which had been unmanned for some time. Her tenure ended in 2013.

She was educated at the University of Bergen, the Darlington College of Technology and the University of Oslo.

She is the grand child of Czech-Norwegian translator Milada Blekastad and painter Hallvard Blekastad.

References 

1970 births
Living people
University of Bergen alumni
University of Oslo alumni
NRK people
Norwegian television news anchors
Norwegian television reporters and correspondents
Norwegian expatriates in England